Ichitarō (also Ichitaro, Ichitarou, Ichitaroh) may refer to:

 Ichitaro (word processor), software
 Ichitarō Doi, professional shogi player